Papa Koami Awounyo or simply Baba Moussa (born August 3, 1991) is a Togolese footballer, who currently plays for Iraqi club Al-Karkh.

Career
Aloenouvo began his career in the youth from US Masséda, was in 2008 promoted to the first team. He played at the 2008 CAF Confederations Cup against the Beninese side UNB.

International career
Awounyo played with the U-17 from Togo at 2007 FIFA U-17 World Cup in South Korea.

References

External links
 
 Papa Koami Awounyo at playmakerstats.com (English version of zerozero.pt)
 Foreign Players in the Iraqi Premier League

1991 births
Living people
Togolese footballers
Togo youth international footballers
Association football fullbacks
Togolese expatriate footballers
AS Marsa players
Al-Shorta SC players
Najaf FC players
Expatriate footballers in Tunisia
Expatriate footballers in Qatar
Expatriate footballers in Iraq
Togolese expatriate sportspeople in Tunisia
Togolese expatriates in Iraq
21st-century Togolese people